Supiri Balawatha is a 2006 Sri Lankan Sinhala comedy, action film directed by Padmasiri Kodikara and produced by Anura Abeysekara. It stars Jeevan Kumaratunga, Ranjan Ramanayake, Bandu Samarasinghe in lead roles along with Sunil Hettiarachchi and Cletus Mendis. Music composed by veteran composer Somapala Rathnayake. It is the 1065th Sri Lankan film in the Sinhala cinema.

Plot

Cast
 Jeevan Kumaratunga
 Ranjan Ramanayake
 Bandu Samarasinghe
 Sunil Hettiarachchi as Florist mudalali
 Lionel Deraniyagala
 Cletus Mendis as Gajanayake
 Manel Wanaguru
 Alexander Fernando
 Lal Senadeera

Soundtrack

References

2006 films
2000s Sinhala-language films
2006 action comedy films
Sri Lankan comedy films
2006 comedy films